Oasis Academy Lord's Hill is an Academy situated in the city of Southampton, Hampshire and specialises in Arts.
Oasis Academy Lord's Hill replaced Millbrook Community School and Oaklands Community School which both closed in August 2008.

History
The Academy opened in September 2008 in the buildings on the two sites of the closed schools, then moved to a new building in 2012. On merging, most students were White British heritage and the number speaking another language at home was low. About 60% of the school pupils were boys. Almost 50% of the students had special educational needs and/or disabilities but no statement. The majority had behavioural, emotional or social difficulties.

Description
Oasis Academy Lord's Hill is part of the Oasis Community Learning group, and evangelical Christian charity. The trust have guided forty schools out of special measures. 19 per cent of the 52 Oasis academies classified as failing. The trust's founder Reverend Steve Chalke says "Turning round a school is sometimes a quick fix, it really, truly is. And sometimes it’s a really long, hard, hard job".

Through its Horizons scheme it is providing each member of staff and student with a tablet.
It is run by Oasis Community Learning (a foundation established by the Oasis Trust).

Curriculum

Virtually all maintained schools and academies follow the National Curriculum, and there success is judged on how well they succeed in delivering a 'broad and balanced curriculum'. Schools endeavour to get all students to achieve the English Baccalaureate qualification – this must include core subjects, a modern or ancient foreign language, and either history or geography.

Key Stage 3
The academy operates a three-year, Key Stage 3 where all the core National Curriculum subjects are taught. Teaching occurs in the mixed ability tutor groups. In year 9 students choose to do one creative subject in depth- which they will continue to the year 11 exams.

Key Stage 4 Core curriculum
English language and literature
Maths
Science

Admissions 

The academy caters for around 700 students in the 11–16 age range, as of 2020.

References

External links
 The school's website

2008 establishments in England
Academies in Southampton
Lord's Hill
Educational institutions established in 2008
Secondary schools in Southampton